Lasianthus kilimandscharicus is a shrub or tree found in Kenya. Flowers white or pale purple.

References

Kilimandscharicus
Flora of Kenya
Plants described in 1895